In the late 19th and the first half of the 20th century, one room schools were commonplace throughout rural Kansas. In most rural schools, all of the students met in a single room. One room meant one teacher who taught basic reading, writing, and arithmetic to both boys and girls of all grades. When one-on-one instruction was necessary, the teacher would call a student forward to the recitation desk.

Supplies might be limited. There was a blackboard, desks or planks for children, a teacher's desk, maps, sometimes a globe and, if the teacher was musical, a piano. In the earliest days, students would often provide their own books, usually from the selection of McGuffey Readers.

Within the school, there was always a water pail and dipper to keep one's cool during the hot summer months. Outside, not far from the front door, was the water pump. And, at a safe and hygienic distance from the school house itself, an outhouse.

In central Kansas, it was common to find a storm shelter where children could go in the event of a tornado.

One-room schools are no longer used in Kansas, falling victim to the declining number of farms and students, the increasing use of automobiles, and school unification.

History

Early Kansas
The area which now includes Kansas was home to many Indian tribes for thousands of years. Non-natives visited the area of Kansas as early as Francisco Vásquez de Coronado 1540 - 1542. He encountered Indians he called the Quiverans, probably ancestors of the Pawnee people. Between 1802 and 1804 Merriweather Lewis and William Clark crossed the northeastern portion of Kansas territory on their way to the Pacific meeting the Kansa Indians from whom the state takes its name. Adventurers and hunters later visited the area known as the Great American Desert, an area, at first, considered unfit for human settlement.

In 1846 Francis Parkman toured western Kansas, hunting the American bison, otherwise known as buffalo. His two-month adventure in Kansas and other western states to be would become the subject of the best selling The Oregon Trail: Sketches of Prairie and Rocky-Mountain Life. James R. Mead, one of the founders of Wichita, explored Kansas between 1859 and 1863, and later settled in Wichita. He knew such colorful characters as Kit Carson, Jesse Chisholm, Buffalo Bill, and Chief Santana. His recollections became a book, Hunting and Trading on the Great Plains, 1859-1875. 

Kansas territory was crossed by at least three major trails. These included western Santa Fe Trail and Oregon Trail, and the south to north Chisholm Trail. These trails served first as routes through Kansas territory or for commercial purpose, but later served to bring settlers to the territory.

First Schools

Indian Mission schools

The Shawnee Indian Mission in Fairway, Kansas was the first school for children in Kansas Territory, serving Shawnee, Delaware and other Indian nations from 1839 to 1854.

In 1847, the Jesuits established a mission school for the Osage Indians in Neosho County at present day St. Paul, Kansas. Like the Shawnee Indian Mission School, education was available for both boys and girls. The curriculum included both academic studies and manual trades. The Jesuits who taught the children blended Native American customs with Christianity. In 1869, following the cessation of Indian lands by the Osage tribe in Kansas, the school became St. Ann's Academy for girls and St. Francis Institution for boys, attracting students from several states.

Kansas Territory
On May 30, 1854, the Kansas Territory was organized, and on August 30, 1855, the first Territorial Legislature made provision by law for a school in each of the counties of the territory. By 1858 the legislature recognized the right of all children regardless of color or religious background to an education. Section 71 of Chapter 8 of the laws of 1858, declares:

"All school districts established under the authority of this act shall be free and without charge for tuition to all children between the age of five and twenty-one years, and no sectarian instruction shall be allowed therein."

Immigration
Settlement in Kansas territory before the Civil War was hampered by the issue of slavery. Kansas became a state in 1861, but not before experiencing a period known as Bleeding Kansas. Even with statehood, questions concerning land titles continued because of Indian claims.

Despite this danger and uncertainty, settlement in Kansas continued. In the Spring of 1863, James R. Mead, noted plainsman and one of the original founders of Wichita, Kansas, first arrived in the Walnut Valley at the extreme western settlement. He came across the tiny community of Towanda where, in addition to the several families staking claims, he saw a "very rough log building called a school house".

Following the Civil War, immigration renewed with passage of the Homestead Act and the final removal of the Osage Indians to Oklahoma, a result of the Drum Creek Treaty. One room schools were added at a furious pace to keep up with the new communities and farms.

A typical example is Lanesfield School near Edgerton, Kansas, and close to Kansas City. The first school session began in 1863 at a house owned by William Gans. By 1867, eighteen pupils attended class in a log schoolhouse on the Burton Dillie farm. In May 1869, nine townsmen met and voted to issue $1,000 worth of school bonds to construct a school built of native Kansas limestone.

Even in sparsely populated rural counties, the demand to build schools for the children of new settlers was intense. In the heart of the Flint Hills Marion County, Kansas for example, had a population of 60 in 1860, and by 1878, its population had increased to 8,306. This same year, the Kansas State Board of Agriculture, reported the number of students and schools for each county, including Marion.

"Schools. - Number of organized districts, 65; school population, 2,913; average salary of teachers, per month, males, $35.45; females, $29.20. School houses built during 1878, 2; frame, 1; stone, 1. Total number of school houses, 64; frame, 50; stone, 14. Value of all school property, $72,918. A few districts have planted maple and cottonwood trees in their school grounds."

The large ratio of children (2,913) to population (8,306) speaks to the large size of families in the early years. Just as remarkable by today's standards, but not by those of early Kansas, is the number of school districts in Marion (65) compared to the relatively small population.

Construction
The materials with which schools were built varied by location and population. Most buildings were of simple frame construction, often with the school bell on a cupola. Especially, in the Flint Hills, native Kansas limestone was used. Sod construction was used in early western Kansas schools, where trees were scarce.

The brick chimney was usually set at the rear of the school room, but in some cases, the chimney was placed between the front door and the class itself. A wall was then constructed to keep away the cold from the classroom, and this area would serve as a chamber room for coats and lunch pails.

An interesting feature of many schools were the two front doors which allowed for separate entrances for boys and girls.

Rural Schools
The conflict between rural communities and cities has always existed and still does. Rural children loved the small communities from which they sprang and enjoyed the freedom of life in the country. But education in rural communities could never hope to compete with that of the city.

By the beginning of the 1920s, the situation in rural one room schools had shown an insurmountable gap in the quality of education. A one-room school was also a one-teacher school. And, in the years 1921 and 1922, a study revealed that 76% of the teachers were new in their positions, and less than 10% had been teaching for more than a year. These teachers were usually young and female. Marriage often accounted for their short tenure.

Notable Schools

Acorn
 
The Acorn Schoolhouse is located in Franklin County on ancient John Brown Highway where it intersects with Iowa Road. The white wooden clapboard school was built in 1900, replacing an earlier structure built in the 1870s. The inscription over the door reads "Acorn School, District 74, built 1900".
Arvonia

Once upon a time it had three stores, one hotel, one blacksmith and wagon shop, a post-office, two churches and a schoolhouse. Today, Arvonia is reduced to a few homes and the beautiful stone school.

Arvonia was settled in 1869, by a company of Welsh people who had formed a colony, with J. Mather Jones as their leader. When the town was started, it was hoped that railroad tracks would be laid along the Marais des Cygnes valley. This failed to happen and the community withered.
<div>

Bazaar
Bazaar was first settled in 1856, three years before Chase County was organized. The town was a stopping point on the Chisholm Trail and, in 1887, became a shipping point for cattle when the Santa Fe Railroad arrived.

Bichet
Bichet school was built in 1896 for the children of French families who settled along the Cottonwood River near Florence, Marion County, Kansas. The first term of 1896 - 1897 included 19 children from 8 families. The names included Bichet, Goffinet, Lalouette, Louis, Martinet, Reverend, Rensen, and Featherkile. Listed in the Historic Register.

Cato
Cato was founded in 1854 at the northern edge of the Cherokee Neutral Lands, now Cherokee and Crawford Counties. The first school was built in 1867. A stone school built in 1869 still stands, after serving as a schoolhouse and a meeting house until the mid 1950s. The school is maintained by the Cato Historical Preservation Association. Never a large town, Cato's population peaked in 1910 with 112 residents.

Kellas
Kellas School, built in 1873, in Newton, Harvey County, Kansas, was located at southeast 12th Street & Hillside. The small wood-frame building was moved to the Harvey County Historical Society in Newton, where it can be visited today.

Extinct Schools
One room schools in Kansas could not hope to compete against larger, better equipped schools in the cities. Rural one room schools had their own problems, especially the inability to retain teachers from year to year because of low pay and declining student enrollment. The automobile also made transportation possible for rural students to cities. The end of an era was at hand.

With the unification of school districts, one room schools were abandoned. In many cases, the schoolhouse reverted to the property owner. Then again, the school itself might be converted into a home or auctioned off. Where the building was on farmland, farmers would burn the structure to revert the land to farm or pasture. Finally, many structures just wasted away with time and weather.

Preservation
There are various projects to preserve the memory of Kansas one room schools. Foremost perhaps is the Kansas One Room School House Project, a Kansas Heritage Project..

Many of the Kansas one room schools still standing are preserved and maintained by local land owners and community groups.

Notes

References
http://www.kansasheritage.org/orsh/
https://web.archive.org/web/20110902154449/http://www.kshs.org/portal_shawnee_indian_mission
http://www.ksgenweb.com/archives/1912/m3/mead_james_r.html
https://web.archive.org/web/20110929033749/http://www.jocomuseum.org/docs/HP%20Articles/National%20Register/Lanesfield%20School.pdf
http://kansasoneroomschools.blogspot.com/p/history.html
Hunting and Trading on the Great Plains,1859-1875. By James R. Mead, edited by Schuyler Jones and introduction by Ignace Mead Jones.
Closed Schools in Kansas (1942) http://cdm16884.contentdm.oclc.org/cdm/singleitem/collection/p16884coll8/id/780/rec/1

Education in Kansas
Defunct schools in Kansas
1800s architecture in the United States